Bomarea goniocaulon is a species of flowering plant in the family Alstroemeriaceae. It is native to Peru and to Ecuador, where it has been collected only three times in the Pichincha Province. It is known from mountain forest habitat.

References

Plants described in 1882
goniocaulon
Flora of Ecuador
Flora of Peru
Critically endangered plants
Taxonomy articles created by Polbot
Taxa named by John Gilbert Baker